Michał Kościuszko (born 20 April 1985 in Kraków) is a Polish rally driver, who currently competes in the Production World Rally Championship (PWRC). He has previously won rounds of the Junior World Rally Championship (JWRC) and has competed in the Super 2000 World Rally Championship (SWRC).

Career

Kościuszko began his motorsport career as a 15-year-old in karting. At 17 he switched to rallying. In 2006 he began competing in the JWRC in a Suzuki Ignis S1600. In 2007 he switched to a Renault Clio S1600, finishing third in the category on Rally Finland. He returned to Suzuki for the final round of the season in a Swift S1600 and continued using the model in 2008. He finished third in the JWRC category and tenth overall on the 2008 Rally Mexico, before winning the next round in Sardinia. He finished the season in fifth in the standings. He continued with Suzuki in 2009, winning in Portugal and Argentina and finishing runner-up overall.

In 2010 Kościuszko made the move to the SWRC, starting the season in a Ford Fiesta S2000. After a podium on the opening round in Mexico he switched to a Skoda Fabia S2000 from his third round of the season in Portugal, where he finished third. He scored a further podium in France on his way to fifth in the final standings. For 2011 he switched to the PWRC, driving a Mitsubishi Lancer Evo X.

WRC results

JWRC results

SWRC results

PWRC results

References

External links

Lotos Dynamic Rally Team 

Living people
1985 births
Sportspeople from Kraków
Polish rally drivers
World Rally Championship drivers
Intercontinental Rally Challenge drivers